A Charlie Brown Christmas is the eighth studio album by American jazz pianist Vince Guaraldi (later credited to the Vince Guaraldi Trio). The album was released in December 1965 in the U.S. by Fantasy Records and was Guaraldi's final studio album for the label. It is the soundtrack to the Christmas television special of the same name.

Guaraldi was contacted by television producer Lee Mendelson to compose music for a documentary on the comic strip Peanuts and its creator, Charles M. Schulz. Although the special went unaired, these selections were released in 1964 as Jazz Impressions of A Boy Named Charlie Brown. Coca-Cola commissioned a Christmas special based on Peanuts in 1965 and Guaraldi returned to score the special.

Guaraldi composed most of the music, though he included versions of traditional carols such as "O Tannenbaum". He recorded some of the score at Whitney Studio in Glendale, California, then re-recorded some of it at Fantasy Records Studios in San Francisco with a children's choir from St. Paul's Episcopal Church in nearby San Rafael. The sessions ran late into the night, with the children rewarded with ice cream afterward.

Bassist Fred Marshall and drummer Jerry Granelli were credited as performing on the album. It was voted into the Grammy Hall of Fame and added to the National Recording Registry of the Library of Congress.

On May 10, 2022, the Recording Industry Association of America (RIAA) certified the album quintuple platinum for sales of 5 million copies. In November 2014, it was the 10th best-selling Christmas/holiday album in the United States during the SoundScan era.

Background
By the early 1960s, Charles M. Schulz's comic strip Peanuts had become a sensation worldwide. Television producer Lee Mendelson acknowledged the strip's cultural impression and produced a documentary on the subject, titled A Boy Named Charlie Brown. Mendelson, a fan of jazz, heard Vince Guaraldi's song "Cast Your Fate to the Wind" on the radio not long after completion of his documentary, and contacted the musician to produce music for the special. Guaraldi composed the music for the project, creating an entire piece, "Linus and Lucy", to serve as the theme. Despite the popularity of the strip and acclaim from advertisers, networks were not interested in the special.

By April 1965, Time featured the Peanuts gang on its magazine cover, and plans for an animated half-hour Peanuts Christmas TV special were commissioned by The Coca-Cola Company. When Coca-Cola commissioned the A Charlie Brown Christmas TV special in spring 1965, Guaraldi returned to write the music, having just recorded the live album At Grace Cathedral at San Francisco's famed cathedral with St. Paul's Church of San Rafael 68-voice choir.

Recording and production
The first instrumentals for the special were recorded by Guaraldi at Glendale, California's Whitney Studio with bassist Monty Budwig and drummer Colin Bailey on March 6, 1965. Recycling "Linus and Lucy" from the earlier special and the album Jazz Impressions of A Boy Named Charlie Brown, Guaraldi completed two new originals, "Skating", and "Christmas Time Is Here". In the weeks preceding the premiere, Mendelson encountered trouble finding a lyricist for Guaraldi's instrumental intro and wrote "Christmas Time Is Here" in "about 15 minutes" on the back of an envelope.

The special begins and ends with a children's choir from St. Paul's Episcopal Church in San Rafael performing "Christmas Time Is Here" and "Hark, the Herald Angels Sing",. Guaraldi had performed with the choir at his May 1965 "jazz mass" performance at Grace Cathedral (released in September 1965 as At Grace Cathedral). The recording sessions were conducted in late autumn 1965 in three sessions over two weeks. They often ran late into the night, resulting in angry parents, some who forbade their children to return; as a result, numerous new children were present at each session. The children were directed by Barry Mineah, who demanded perfection from the choir. Mendelson and Guaraldi disagreed, wanting "kids to sound like kids"; they used a slightly off-key version of "Hark, the Herald Angels Sing" in the final cut. Children were paid five dollars for their participation. In addition, the children recorded dialogue for the special's final scene in which the crowd of kids shout "Merry Christmas, Charlie Brown!" 

One of the singers, Candace Hackett Shively, became an elementary school teacher and sent a letter of gratitude to Schulz after he announced his retirement in 2000. In the letter, she recalls recording the choir at Fantasy Studios and going out for ice cream afterwards, while noting that she tells the story to her students every holiday season.

Guaraldi brought in bassist Fred Marshall and drummer Jerry Granelli and re-recorded tracks such as "The Christmas Song" and "Greensleeves". The album credited Guaraldi solely, neglecting to mention the other musicians; Guaraldi was notorious for never keeping records of his session players. Nearly three decades later, in an effort to correct the matter, Fantasy surmised that the recordings with Budwig and Bailey were employed in the television special while Marshall and Granelli recorded the album. Despite this, other musicians have claimed to have recorded the special's music: bassists Eugene Firth and Al Obidinski and drummers Paul Distel and Benny Barth. Firth and Distil are noted as performers on a studio-session report Guaraldi filed for the American Federation of Musicians.

Not all music featured in the current version of the holiday special was released on the soundtrack. After the inaugural broadcast of the special in December 1965, Lee Mendelson and Bill Melendez fitted several scenes with the songs "Charlie Brown Theme," "Happiness Theme" and "Frieda (with the Naturally Curly Hair)", all lifted from Jazz Impressions of A Boy Named Charlie Brown. In addition, "Air Music" (aka "Surfin' Snoopy") from the soundtrack of Charlie Brown's All Stars! was inserted in the scene where Snoopy is decorating his doghouse with Christmas ornaments. These four additional songs were not included in the soundtrack release as they were not part of the original show. Additionally, tracks "What Child Is This" and "The Christmas Song" are on this recording, but were not included in the special.

Reception

Commercial performance
On May 10, 2022, the Recording Industry Association of America (RIAA) certified the album quintuple platinum for sales of 5 million copies, making it the second-best-selling jazz album in history, behind Miles Davis’ Kind of Blue (1959).

A Charlie Brown Christmas first appeared on a Billboard magazine music sales chart on the week of December 19, 1987, when it debuted and peaked at No. 13 on the Billboard Christmas Albums sales chart. The album charted on the Billboard Christmas Albums chart every Christmas/holiday season from 1988 through 2003, peaking as high as No. 8 in both 2001 and 2002. The album also charted on the Billboard Top Pop Catalog Albums chart during the Christmas/holiday season every year from 1991 through 2003, peaking as high as No. 6 in 2001.

It became the first jazz soundtrack album to reach the Top 10 outside of a specialty album chart (i.e. Christmas Albums, Top Pop Catalog Albums, Kids Albums) when, in January 2021, it reached No. 10 in the Billboard 200 chart. Derrick Bang, Guaraldi historian and author of Vince Guaraldi at the Piano, noted the significance of such a "huge" accomplishment, with Guaraldi sharing top spots with Taylor Swift, Paul McCartney and Eminem.

In November 2014, it was the 10th best-selling Christmas/holiday album in the United States during the SoundScan era.

A Charlie Brown Christmas was also the 10th best-selling holiday album of 2011, a year that marked the sixth time since 2001 that the album had ranked among the year's top 10 Christmas albums. It was also the ninth best-selling album of 2013.

On November 18, 2021, it was ranked as the No. 1 Greatest Holiday 200 album of All Time by Billboard.

Critical reception

Allmusic reviewer Shawn M. Haney called it "joyous and festive meditation for the holiday season" writing, "Guaraldi strings together elegant, enticing arrangements that reflect the spirit and mood of Schulz's work." Dominique Leone at Pitchfork called the songs "small, observant miracles...If there's a muted quality to a lot of this music, it's smiling nonetheless."

The soundtrack to A Charlie Brown Christmas has been considered "one of the most beloved holiday albums recorded." Chris Barton of the Los Angeles Times asserts that the soundtrack introduced jazz to an entirely new generation, having been heard by more individuals than the work of the genre's most influential players, including Miles Davis and John Coltrane. The score influenced dozens of young aspiring musicians, among them David Benoit and George Winston. Haney wrote that the record "introduce[d] contemporary jazz to youngsters with grace, charm, and creativity." In 2019, it was ranked the fourth greatest Christmas album of all time by Rolling Stone.

A Charlie Brown Christmas was voted into the Grammy Hall of Fame in 2007. In 2012 the album was added to the Library of Congress's National Recording Registry for being "culturally, historically, or aesthetically significant".

Track listing
Side one
 "O Tannenbaum" (Ernst Anschütz) – 5:08
 "What Child Is This" (William Chatterton Dix) – 2:25
 "My Little Drum" (Vince Guaraldi) – 3:12
 "Linus and Lucy" (Guaraldi) – 3:06
 "Christmas Time Is Here (instrumental)" (Guaraldi) – 6:05

Side two
 "Christmas Time Is Here (vocal)" (Guaraldi, Lee Mendelson) – 2:47
 "Skating" (Guaraldi) – 2:27
 "Hark, the Herald Angels Sing" (Charles Wesley) – 1:55
 "Christmas Is Coming" (Guaraldi) – 3:25
 "Fur Elise" (Ludwig van Beethoven) – 1:06
 "The Christmas Song" (Mel Tormé, Robert Wells) – 3:17

Bonus track - 1988 onwards
 "Greensleeves" (traditional) – 5:25

Note:  "Greensleeves" is actually the original title of the tune used for "What Child is This".

Personnel
Vince Guaraldi Trio
 Vince Guaraldi – piano, bandleader, Hammond organ on "Hark, The Herald Angels Sing"
 Fred Marshall – double bass
 Monty Budwig – double bass ("Linus and Lucy", "Greensleeves")
 Jerry Granelli – drums
 Colin Bailey – drums ("Linus and Lucy", "Greensleeves")

Children's chorus for the songs "Christmas Time Is Here", "Hark, The Herald Angels Sing" and when the kids all shout "Merry Christmas Charlie Brown" was the Children's choir of St. Paul's Episcopal Church in San Rafael, California. Several months before the making of Charlie Brown Christmas this choir was featured on the recording Vince Guaraldi at Grace Cathedral.

Original production
 Soul S. Weiss – recording engineer (attributed on the back cover, original album pressing)

Production
 Ralph J. Gleason – liner notes
 Derrick Bang – liner notes
 Joel Selvin – liner notes (2006 reissue)
 George Horn – mastering (1986, 1988, 2006 reissues)
 Stephen Hart – mixing (2006 reissue)
 Adam Munoz – mixing (2012 reissue)
 Joe Tarantino – mastering (2012 reissue)
 Nick Phillips – reissue producer
 Joe Tarantino – remastering
 Paul Blakemore – mixing (2022 reissue)

Charts

Weekly charts

Year-end charts

Certifications

See also
A Philly Special Christmas, a 2022 album with a cover similar to this one

Notes

During an interview on an episode of CBS Sunday Morning, Lee Mendelson said that the original choice for the soundtrack was Dave Brubeck, who initially accepted. However, several weeks into the project due to unforeseen circumstances related to other commitments, he suggested Guaraldi to replace him.

References

Sources

External links
 
 March 2015 radio interview (KDRT program "Davisville") with David Willat, who as a child sang in the A Charlie Brown Christmas chorus, and Guaraldi author Derrick Bang
 November 2022 radio interview (KDRT program "Davisville") with Jason and Sean Mendelson, and Derrick Bang, about the extended deluxe versions of A Charlie Brown Christmas released in late 2022 
Jazzy ‘Charlie Brown Christmas’ swings on after 57 years by David Bauder, from AP News

1965 Christmas albums
1965 soundtrack albums
Grammy Hall of Fame Award recipients
Albums arranged by Vince Guaraldi
Vince Guaraldi soundtracks
Christmas albums by American artists
Jazz Christmas albums
Cool jazz soundtracks
Mainstream jazz soundtracks
Fantasy Records soundtracks
Peanuts music
Television animation soundtracks
United States National Recording Registry recordings
United States National Recording Registry albums